The Real Folk Blues is a compilation album by blues musician Howlin' Wolf, which was released by Chess Records in 1965. The album's songs, which were originally issued as singles, were recorded in Chicago between 1956 and 1965.

Reception

The AllMusic review stated: "In the mid-'60s, Chess Records released a great series of compilations of '40s and '50s singles by some of its best blues artists, all of them called The Real Folk Blues. The Howlin' Wolf entry is possibly the best of the batch, and one of the best introductions to this mercurial electric bluesman. Opening with the savage "Killing Floor," the album doesn't let up in intensity, and it happily focuses on Wolf's less-anthologized sides, which gives the album a freshness a lot of blues compilations lack".

Track listing
All compositions credited to Chester Burnett except where noted
 "Killing Floor" – 2:48
 "Louise" – 2:42
 "Poor Boy" – 2:32
 "Sittin' on Top of the World" – 2:30
 "Nature" – 2:45
 "My Country Suga Mama" – 2:34
 "Tail Dragger" (Willie Dixon) – 2:56
 "Three Hundred Pounds of Joy" (Dixon) – 2:59
 "The Natchez Burnin'" – 2:10
 "Built for Comfort" (Dixon) – 2:30
 "Ooh Baby, Hold Me" – 2:35
 "Tell Me What I've Done" – 2:47
Recorded in Chicago on July 19, 1956 (track 9), June 24, 1957 (track 5), December 1957 (tracks 3 & 4), September 28, 1962 (track 7), August 14, 1963 (tracks 8 & 10), August 1964 (track 1, 2 & 6) and April 15, 1965 (tracks 11 & 12)

Personnel
Howlin' Wolf – vocals, harmonica, guitar
J. T. Brown (track 7, 8 & 10), Adolph 'Billy' Duncan (track 5), Arnold Rogers (tracks 1, 2 & 6), Eddie Shaw (tracks 11 & 12) – tenor saxophone
Donald Hankins – baritone saxophone (tracks 8 & 10)
Lee Eggleston (tracks 11 & 12), Johnny Jones (tracks 1, 2, 6 & 7), Hosea Lee Kennard (tracks 3-5 & 9), Lafayette Leake (tracks 8 & 10), Otis Spann (track 9) – piano
Buddy Guy (tracks 8 & 10-12), Willie Johnson (tracks 5 & 9), Otis "Big Smokey" Smothers (tracks 5 & 9), Hubert Sumlin (tracks 1-4, 6-8 & 10-12) – guitar
Jerome Arnold (track 7, 8 & 10), Willie Dixon (tracks 5 & 9), Alfred Elkins (tracks 3 & 4), Andrew Palmer (tracks 1, 2 & 6), Andrew "Blueblood" McMahon – bass
Junior Blackmon (tracks 1, 2, 6 & 7), Earl Phillips (tracks 3-5 & 9), Sam Lay (tracks 8 & 10-12) – drums

References

Howlin' Wolf albums
1965 albums
Chess Records albums
Albums produced by Marshall Chess